"It’s Christmas Time" is a song recorded by Sarah Engels. It features vocals from Pietro Lombardi. It was written and produced by DSDS jury member Dieter Bohlen. The song was released on December 2, 2011 in Germany.

Track listing
Digital download
 "It's Christmas Time" - 2:58

Chart performance

Release history

References

2011 singles
Sarah Lombardi songs
Pietro Lombardi (singer) songs
Songs written by Dieter Bohlen
2011 songs